Karekare could refer to:

Karekare, New Zealand, a coastal settlement nestled in Auckland's Waitākere Ranges
Karekare language, a language of Nigeria
Kare-kare, a Filipino oxtail stew with thick peanut sauce